Robert Zimmerman (2 December 1881 – 3 December 1980) was a Canadian freestyle and backstroke swimmer. He competed at the 1908 Summer Olympics and the 1912 Summer Olympics.

References

External links
 

1881 births
1980 deaths
Canadian male backstroke swimmers
Canadian male freestyle swimmers
Canadian male divers
Olympic divers of Canada
Olympic swimmers of Canada
Divers at the 1908 Summer Olympics
Divers at the 1912 Summer Olympics
Swimmers at the 1908 Summer Olympics
Swimmers from Chicago
American emigrants to Canada